Bjarte is a Norwegian male given name and may refer to:

Bjarte Lunde Aarsheim (born 1975), Norwegian footballer
Bjarte Baasland (born 1974), former Norwegian businessman and convicted fraudster
Bjarte Birkeland (1920–2000), Norwegian literary researcher
Bjarte Breiteig (born 1974), Norwegian short story writer
Bjarte Bruland (born 1969), Norwegian historian
Bjarte Eikeset (born 1937), Norwegian lawyer, judge and politician for the Conservative Party
Bjarte Flem (born 1958), former Norwegian football goalkeeper
Bjarte Haugsdal (born 1990), Norwegian footballer
Bjarte Hjelmeland (born 1970), Norwegian actor and theatre director
Bjarte Ludvigsen (born 1975), record producer from Bergen, Norway
Bjarte Myrhol (born 1982), Norwegian handball player
Bjarte Tørå (born 1953), Norwegian politician for the Christian Democratic Party
Bjarte Engen Vik (born 1971), former Norwegian Nordic combined athlete